The following lists events that happened during 2009 in Bhutan.

Incumbents
 Monarch: Jigme Khesar Namgyel Wangchuck 
 Prime Minister: Jigme Thinley

Events

September
 September 21 - A 6.1 magnitude earthquake occurs in eastern Bhutan and is felt in northeast India, Tibet and Bangladesh, leaving at least 10 dead.
 September 22 - Rescue teams scour eastern Bhutan after at least 11 people are killed by an earthquake which struck the region.
 September 23 - Prime Minister of Bhutan Jigme Thinley describes an earthquake which hit the Himalayan kingdom on Monday as "one of the biggest disasters in recent times".

References

 
2000s in Bhutan
Years of the 21st century in Bhutan
Bhutan
Bhutan